Cowrie Point is a rural locality in the local government area (LGA) of Circular Head in the North-west and west LGA region of the island state of Tasmania, Australia. The 2016 census recorded a population of 14 for the state suburb of Cowrie Point.

History 
Cowrie Point was gazetted as a locality in 1962. 

Originally called Cowrie Point (after the geographical feature) it was proposed in 1965 that the settlement be renamed Brickmakers Bay (after another nearby geographical feature) but this was not accepted.

Geography
The waters of Bass Strait form most of the northern boundary.

Road infrastructure 
Route A2 (Bass Highway) runs through from north-east to north-west.

References

Towns in Tasmania
Localities of Circular Head Council